The 2013 Discover BCS National Championship Game was a postseason college football bowl game that took place on Monday, January 7, 2013, at Sun Life Stadium in Miami Gardens, Florida.  It featured the No. 1 ranked Notre Dame Fighting Irish and No. 2 Alabama Crimson Tide. The Alabama Crimson Tide defeated the Notre Dame Fighting Irish 42–14 for the national championship and took home the Championship Trophy.

Alabama was the defending champion and represented the Southeastern Conference, which had participated in and emerged victorious from every standalone BCS Championship Game (since the format was introduced in the 2006–2007 season). Notre Dame did not belong to a conference and was the first independent team to play in the National Championship game since the start of the BCS.

The National Championship game between Alabama and Notre Dame was anticipated as an historical matchup with a rich tradition in college football. Going into the holiday season after Alabama was assured a spot in the National Championship after beating Georgia in the SEC Championship, sportscasters from both sides weighed in on who was most likely to win. Despite the historical record of, at the time, 5–1 in favor of Notre Dame many sports betting centers had Alabama as a heavy favorite with point spreads favoring Alabama as high as ten points over Notre Dame. Many prominent sports writers predicted Notre Dame to win based on several factors including strong overall defense, an inconsistent Alabama team (often cited as being "exposed" against LSU and Texas A&M), and various intangibles such as destiny and generalized fatigue from the dominant performances of the Southeastern Conference.

In the aftermath of an Alabama 42 to 14 victory (with the score being 35 to 0 at one point in the game), the BCS National Championship game was considered by Sports Illustrated'''s Michael Rosenberg to have failed to live up to its hype despite dominating television ratings. Mark Schlabach of ESPN expressed the wish that a playoff system had been in place wherein Oregon or Florida would have played against Alabama. Tom Coyne of Associated Press concluded that Alabama was more talented and physical with better preparation and execution of its game plan than Notre Dame. Specifically, inconsistent tackling, blown coverages, and porous defense were cited by Aaron Ellis of Forbes.com'' as major detriments to Notre Dame's efforts.

With the win, Alabama won their second straight BCS championship, their third championship in four years, and their ninth AP championship overall. Alabama was the last team to become back-to-back champions until the Georgia Bulldogs in 2022 and 2023.

Point spread 
While Notre Dame came into the game undefeated and ranked No. 1 in the country, as of January 3, 2013, the point spread on the game according to leading Las Vegas casinos projected Alabama to win by between 9.5 and 10 points. Two billion dollars were expected to be wagered on the game.

Teams
It was the seventh meeting between Alabama and Notre Dame, but the teams' first since 1987. Heading into the game, Notre Dame led the series 5-1-0, which included two bowl victories. The two teams first met in the 1973 Sugar Bowl, with the Irish defeating the Crimson Tide, 24–23. Following the game, Notre Dame was voted national champions by the Associated Press while Alabama had been declared the champion by UPI in a poll taken prior to this Sugar Bowl contest, the last time the final U.P.I./Coaches poll was announced before the bowl games.

Alabama

During the regular season, Alabama led the nation in total defense, giving up 246.00 yards per game, and in rushing defense by allowing 79.77 yards per game. The team also led the SEC in scoring defense (10.7 points per game) and rushing defense (79.9 yards per game), was second in scoring offense (38.5 points per game) and rushing offense (224.62 yards per game). Key players for the Crimson Tide were quarterback A. J. McCarron, who led the nation in passing efficiency with a 173.08 rating; cornerback Dee Milliner, a Nagurski Award finalist; linebacker C.J. Mosley, a finalist in the Butkus Award; and center Barrett Jones, the National Football Foundation Scholar-Athlete/William V. Campbell Trophy recipient and the Rimington Trophy winner. McCarron gained 5,655 yards for Alabama, which include 5,692 passing yards and losing 37 rushing yards. Alabama averaged 224.6 rushing yards per game without allowing a sack all season.

Notre Dame

During the regular season, Notre Dame was the national leader in scoring defense (10.3 points per game) and sixth in total defense (286.83 yards per game). Key players for the Fighting Irish were freshman quarterback Everett Golson, who passed for 2,135 yards for 11 touchdowns and rushed for 305 yards for five touchdowns; senior linebacker and Heisman trophy finalist Manti Te'o, who had 103 tackles and seven interceptions, his third-straight 100-plus tackle season for a career 427 tackles; defensive end Stephon Tuitt, who ranked seventh with others in sacks/game (1.00) and needed two sacks to become the school's single-season record holder; guard Mike Golic Jr., who helped the team averaging more than 200 yards per game in both passing and rushing; and tight end Tyler Eifert, the John Mackey Award winner who caught 44 passes for 624 yards and four touchdowns.

Starting lineups

 (number corresponds to draft round)

† = 2012 All-American

Game summary

Statistics

Notes

References

BCS National Championship Game
2013
2013
2013
American football in Florida
Sports competitions in Miami Gardens, Florida
2013 in sports in Florida
January 2013 sports events in the United States